This is a list of electoral results for the Electoral district of Cockburn Sound in Western Australian state elections.

Members for Cockburn Sound

Election results

Elections in the 1900s

References

Western Australian state electoral results by district